James Armstrong (August 29, 1748 – May 6, 1828) was an American slave owner, physician, judge, and politician.

Early life
Armstrong was born in Carlisle, Pennsylvania on August 29, 1748.  He was a son of Brigadier General and Continental Congressman John Armstrong and Rebecca (née Lyon) Armstrong (1719–1797).  His older sister Rebecca Armstrong was the wife of James Turner and his younger brother was John Armstrong Jr., who became the U.S. Secretary of War and served as the Minister to France and a U.S. Senator from New York.

He was educated at the Philadelphia Academy and at Nassau Hall (later the College of New Jersey, and today known as Princeton University). He studied medicine at Dr. John Morgan's School in Philadelphia before graduating from the University of Pennsylvania in 1769.

Career
After his graduation from medical school, he moved to Winchester in Frederick County, Virginia where he established a medical practice.

During the American Revolutionary War, he served as a medical officer and is sometimes confused with several other James Armstrongs in the war.  After the war, he spent three years in England to further his medical studies before returning to Carlisle in 1788.  After Carlisle, he relocated to Mifflin County, Pennsylvania where for twelve years he practiced medicine and was appointed as an associate Judge.

In 1792, he was elected as a Pro-Administration candidate to represent Pennsylvania in the United States House of Representatives from 1793 until 1795, serving in the 3rd U.S. Congress.  After his single term in Congress, he returned to Carlisle in 1796 and continued practicing medicine.  In 1796, he was elected a trustee of Dickinson College.

On September 12, 1808, he was appointed an associate judge of the Cumberland County Court.

Personal life
In 1789, Armstrong was married to Mary Stevenson (1766–1813), a daughter of large land-owner and iron manufacturer George Stevenson, Esq. (formerly the deputy surveyor-general under Nicholas Scull for the "territories of Pennsylvania") and sister of Dr. George Stevenson, who served with distinction at the Battle of Brandywine. Together, they were the parents of nine children, including:

 John Wilkins Armstrong (1798–1870), a doctor who married Mary Susanna Shell (1813–1855) in 1825.

Armstrong died on May 6, 1828 in Carlisle and was buried in the Old Carlisle Cemetery.

Descendants
Through his son John, he was a grandfather of Mary Armstrong (1828–1898), wife of Christian Bowers Herman, and Cassius M. Armstrong (1846–1896), who married Jennie Hershman.

References

External links
 
 

1748 births
1828 deaths
People from Carlisle, Pennsylvania
People of colonial Pennsylvania
American people of Scotch-Irish descent
Pro-Administration Party members of the United States House of Representatives from Pennsylvania
American slave owners
University of Pennsylvania alumni
Princeton University alumni
Physicians in the American Revolution
Continental Army officers from Pennsylvania